The All-American Protectorate, Inc., was a right-wing political group incorporated in February 1963 in St. Louis County, Missouri, under the leadership of general chairman Lovell W. George, and board-of-directors members George R. Kleine and Ernest Conn. The group aimed to provide defense training for its members, and advocated racial segregation and strict immigration controls.

The group's slogan stated that the group's aim was: "Teaching That 'Government is Management' and Granting 'Confirmation in Citizenship.'"

References

White supremacist groups in the United States
History of St. Louis County, Missouri
Patriot movement
1963 establishments in Missouri